Miroslav Milošević (born 28 March 1986) is an Austrian footballer who currently plays for SV Leobendorf. Milošević is of Serbian descent and is therefore able to represent both Austria and Serbia at international level.

References

External links
 

1986 births
Living people
Austrian footballers
NK Slavija Vevče players
SV Horn players
First Vienna FC players
SC-ESV Parndorf 1919 players
SC Ritzing players
FC Wacker Innsbruck (2002) players
2. Liga (Austria) players
Austrian Football Bundesliga players
Association football midfielders
Footballers from Vienna
Austrian people of Serbian descent
Austrian expatriate sportspeople in Slovenia
Austrian expatriate footballers
Expatriate footballers in Slovenia